The 2007 World Jiu-Jitsu Championship was held at California State University in Long Beach, California, United States. It was the first Mundial tournament to be held outside Brazil.

Results

Academy Results

External links 
 World Jiu-Jitsu Championship

World Jiu-Jitsu Championship
World Jiu